Yiguandao / I-Kuan Tao, meaning the Consistent Way or Persistent Way, is a Chinese salvationist religious sect that emerged in the late 19th century, in Shandong, to become China's most important redemptive society in the 1930s and 1940s, especially during the Japanese invasion. In the 1930s Yiguandao spread rapidly throughout China led by Zhang Tianran, who is the eighteenth patriarch of the Latter Far East Tao Lineage, and Sun Suzhen, the first matriarch of the Lineage.

Yiguandao started off with a few thousand followers in Shandong in the 1930s, but under the Patriarch and Matriarch's leadership and with missionary work the group grew to become the biggest movement in China in the 1940s with millions of followers. In 1949, Yiguandao was proscribed in mainland China as an illegal secret society and heretical cult as part of the greater antireligious campaign that took place. Yiguandao has since flourished in Taiwan, despite decades of persecution by the Kuomintang that officially ended in 1987 with the legalization of Yiguandao and a government apology. Yiguandao is still not able to be officially promoted in the mainland, but there are many members who live and practice there.

According to Dr. Sebastien Billioud, Yiguandao can be viewed as an updated version of the tradition unity of the three teachings of Confucianism, Taoism, and Buddhism. In Yiguandao's case it also incorporated Christianity and Islam becoming a unity of the five teachings.

Yiguandao is characterized by an eschatological and soteriological doctrine, presenting itself as a way to salvation. It also encourages adherents to engage in missionary activity. Yiguandao is the worship of the source of the universal reality personified as the Eternal Venerable Mother, or the Splendid Highest Deity. The highest deity is the primordial energy of the universe, identified in Yiguandao thought with the Tao in the wuji or "unlimited" state and with fire. The name used in contemporary Yiguandao scriptures is the "Infinite Mother" and the "lantern of the Mother"—a flame representing the Mother—is the central focus of Yiguandao shrines.

Beliefs

Eternal Venerable Mother
Yiguandao focuses on the worship of the Infinite Mother (Wujimu), also known as the Eternal Venerable Mother (Wusheng Laomu), which is also a feature of other Chinese folk religions. The source of things, It is neither male nor female, though it is called "Mother" or "Heavenly Mater". It is the primordial force of the universe, the fire, that animates all things. It is the Tao, as Yiguandao doctrines explain.

In the 16th century the Eternal Mother began to take the place of the Holy Patriarch. A mythology surrounding the Mother began to form, integrating the beliefs about Maitreya, which had been widespread since the Yuan dynasty. The Maitreya belief is millenarian, claiming that the world would come to an end soon and Maitreya would incarnate himself in the physical plane to save humanity.

In the Mother belief, the Maitreya is one of the three enlightened beings sent by the Mother herself to bring salvation. Further myths explained the creation of the world and mankind: the Eternal Venerable Mother gave birth to yin and yang and two children, Fuxi and Nüwa, who begot auspicius stars and all sentient beings. The human beings were sent to the east and lost their memory of the Mother. The myth of Fuxi and Nüwa is found also in orthodox Chinese mythology.

The figure of the Eternal Mother derives from that of Xiwangmu, the "Queen Mother of the West", the ancient mother goddess of China, related to the mythical Kunlun, the axis mundi, and thus to the Hundun. The Infinite Mother is thought as omnipotent, and regarded by Yiguandao followers as merciful, worried by her sons and daughters who lost their true nature, and for this reason trying to bring them back to the original heaven. Through its development, the Eternal Mother belief has shown the qualities of the three goddesses Xiwangmu, Nüwa and Guanyin.

Gods and teachers
In all Yiguandao temples, there are three lamps situated on an altar. The central lamp represents the Eternal Mother, while the two sides lamps, both evenly situated at a lower level, represent Yin and Yang. Generally, in larger public temples, a statue of Maitreya is placed in the central position, accompanied by the Holy Teachers, Jigong on the right, and Yue Hui Bodhisattva on the left. In private temples, there is no required configuration. Members can choose statues of other deities, such as Guanyin and Guangong, or they can even choose to have none at all.

As Yiguandao's written material explains:

The patriarchs of the faith are Zhang Tianran and Sun Suzhen. They are considered the final patriarchs of the divine revelation and are revered as divine entities.

Cosmology

Yiguandao conceives the cosmos as tripartite, consisting of litian (the right heaven), qitian (the spiritual heaven) and xiangtian (the material plane). Litian is the heaven of the Eternal Mother, where there's no cycle of rebirth; qitian is the plane imbued by the gods and spirits who despite being in a higher realm than human beings, can still incarnate as matter. Xiangtian is the physical world that is composed of all visible things, with colors and shapes, including all the stars and the sky. Only litian is eternal, and qitian and xiangtian will be re-absorbed into litian.

Salvation

Yiguandao involves an eschatological—soteriological belief: Grieving over the loss of her children, the Eternal Mother sent to the material world three enlightened beings over the "Three Eras". Accordingly, the human history is divided into "Three Eras": Qingyang Qi or Green Yang Era, Hongyang Qi or Red Yang Era, and Baiyang Qi or White Yang Era. Dipankara Buddha presided over salvation in the Green Yang Era, Gautama Buddha in the Red Yang Era, and Maitreya Buddha will preside over the third period of salvation, the White Yang Era, which began in 1912 and continues even now.

Extreme ruthlessness and craftiness in human behavior and disasters are associated with the end of the third period and final salvation. Cultivation of the Tao is the opportunity for repentance and purification during the White Yang Era. Those who devote their efforts to the spread of the Tao will be repaid for their merits, regardless of their societal status.

Practices and writings

Three Treasures
The rite of initiation involves the "offering of the Three Treasures" (chuan Sanbao), which are the xuanguan (the heavenly portal), the koujue (a mantra), and hetong (the hand gesture). The Three Treasures are the saving grace offered by the Eternal Mother to people who received the initiation. They enable Yiguandao members to transcend the circle of birth and death and directly ascend to Heaven after they die.

Yiguandao followers regard the initiation ceremony as the most important ritual. The full meaning of the Three Treasures is a secret of Yiguandao followers and is strictly prohibited from being spread openly to those who have not gone through the initiation process. The Three Treasures are also used in daily life as a form of meditation.

Yiguandao Canon
A unitary anthology of Yiguandao's writings, the Yiguandao Canon (一貫道藏 Yīguàndào zàng), was published in the 2010s with the purpose of offering a systematic overview of the religious doctrines.

History

19th century origins
Yiguandao originated in the late 19th century in Shandong as a branch of Xiantiandao ("Way of Former Heaven"), which in turn was founded in Jiangxi in the 17th century Qing dynasty as an offshoot of the Venerable Officials' teaching of fasting (老官齋教 Lǎoguān zhāijiào), a branch of the Dacheng (大乘 "Great Vehicle") or Yuandun (圓頓 "Sudden Stillness") eastern proliferation of Luoism. It has also been traced to the White Lotus tradition.

In the 1870s, under persecutions from the Qing, Xiantiandao fragmented into several independent groups. One branch led by the Shandong native Wang Jueyi later developed into Yiguandao. According to Yiguandao records, Wang Jueyi was designated as the 15th patriarch of Xiantiandao through a divine revelation through writing. Wang renamed his sect the "Final Salvation" (Mohou Yizhu) and deeply contributed to the development of its theology and ritual, now being regarded as the real founder of modern Yiguandao.

After a persecution started in 1883 because the Qing suspected that the sect intended to organize a rebellion, Wang was forced to live secretly until his death. Liu Qingxu succeeded the leadership becoming the 16th patriarch. In 1905, borrowing a Confucius saying that "the way that I follow is the one that unifies all" (wudao yiyiguanzhi), he gave the religion the name Yiguandao ("Unity Way").

Under Liu the Yiguandao remained small. Things changed after Lu Zhongyi became the 17th patriarch in 1919. Claiming to be the incarnation of Maitreya, Lu gathered thousands of members in Shandong. When Lu died in 1925 one group of the followers he left was led by Zhang Tianran, the man who became the 18th patriarch in following years.

Zhang Tianran's leadership and spread in the 1930s

Between the late years of the Qing dynasty and 1945, China went through a period of crisis, civil unrest and foreign invasion. The Confucian orthodoxy and the empire crumbled quickly. In the republican China between 1912 and 1949 folk religious sects mushroomed and expanded rapidly.

Zhang Tianran, whose secular name was Zhang Guangbi, was born in 1889 in Jining, Shandong. In 1915, he was initiated into Yiguandao by Lu Zhongyi, the 17th patriarch of the sect. After the death of Lu in 1925 the movement fragmented due to strife over the leadership. One of the subgroups that formed was led by Zhang Tianran.

In 1930, Zhang Tianran became the 18th patriarch of Yiguandao. He took Sun Suzhen as his partner, proclaiming that their marriage was a message from the Eternal Mother, and that he was the incarnation of Jigong, a deified miracle monk that lived between the late 12th and the 13th century. However, few members welcomed the new claims; many challenged the validity of the revelation and left the group. For this reason, Zhang Tianran and his wife moved to Jinan in 1931. There, different religious groups were competing with each other, and Zhang Tianran began preaching Yiguandao himself.

Zhang Tianran recruited hundreds of followers, and Jinan became the main base of Yiguandao. Many initiated members began preaching in other big cities, where Yiguandao was well received. From 1934 Yiguandao missionaries were sent to Tianjin and Qingdao. To facilitate the spread Zhang Tianran restructured Yiguandao, that since then had preserved the nine-levels structure (jiupin liantai) of Xiantiandao. The new structure had four levels, Zhang as the patriarch, and below him the leaders of the way (daozhang), the initiators (dianchuan shi), and further below the masters of the altars (tanzhu). The initiators functioned as missionaries, while the masters of altars were managers of administrative units composed of multiple congregations.

With the rapid growth of Yiguandao, Zhang Tianran's status as a divine patriarch (shizun) was strengthened, with a large number of pamphlets published to justify his divinity. The following one is an example:

Fuji, shanshu and rituals

With its centralized authority and highly degree of organization, Yiguandao had an extraordinary power of mobilization. At first, fuji, the practice of receiving direct revelations from the gods which is closely linked to the Chinese intellectual tradition since the Song dynasty, contributed to the dynamism of the movement.

Divine revelations were published in "morality books" (shanshu), and distributed to the general public for moral edification of the society. Divine writing was also used to offer oracles for everyday problems.

Fuji was introduced into Yiguandao despite Wang Jueyi, the 15th patriarch of the lineage, discouraging it. Zhang Tianran distinguished between "innate writing" (xiantian ji), received by juvenile media and considered superior to "acquired writing" (houtian ji), received by old media. Youth purity is considered more conductive of divine revelation. Zhang stressed that only Yiguandao fuji is xiantian ji (revealing the original Heaven).

Divinely inspired writing was later rejected by some branches of Yiguandao, as new scriptures produced new schisms, and gradually declined within the religion as a whole.

Yiguandao also spread and gathered financial support through the performance of "rituals of salvation of the ancestors". Rules and practices for the followers were also systematized. Zhang Tianran also gave much importance to aggressive missionary work, contrasting with the Chinese tradition of peaceful coexistence. In 1938 he held missionary workshops named "stove meetings" (lu hui) to train missionaries in Tianjin.Hundreds of missionaries were trained in these workshops, and they were sent all over the country. Many became influential leaders of Yiguandao.

Rapid growth in the 1940s
Through missionary activity, in the political and social turmoil caused by the Japanese invasion of China in the 1940s, that made Yiguandao's millenarian beliefs more convincing to the masses, the religion grew rapidly, reaching an estimated membership of 12 million. Even a number of top officials of the Japanese puppet government of Wang Jingwei converted to Yiguandao.

Suppression in China after 1949
With the rise of the Chinese Communist Party in 1949, Yiguandao was suppressed, being viewed as the biggest reactionary huidaomen. In December 1950 The People's Daily published the editorial "Firmly Banning Yiguandao" (Jianjue Qudi Yiguandao), proclaiming that the movement had been used as a counterrevolutionary tool by imperialists and the Kuomintang. The article claimed that Yiguandao members were traitors collaborating with the Japanese invaders, Kuomintang spies, and reactionary landlords.

The editorial marked the beginning of the nationwide campaign of eradication of Yiguandao. The main target of the campaign was to destroy the movement's organization and leadership. The top leaders were executed or sent to prison, the members were forced to undergo political re-education and they were kept under close surveillance.

An exhibition denouncing Yiguandao was held in Beijing in January 1951. In 1952 the communists released "The Way of Persistently Harming People" (Yiguan Hairen Dao), a film against Yiguandao. A number of Yiguandao believers, including Sun Suzhen, fled to Hong Kong and later to Taiwan, where the religion currently thrives.

Spread to other regions and return to the mainland

Taiwan
In Kuomintang-governed Taiwan after 1949, there was initially a climate of restrictions of Chinese traditional religions and Yiguandao was attacked as immoral, politically charged, and suspect of cooperation with communists of mainland China. Yiguandao was officially outlawed in 1952 and driven underground. The Buddhist circles of Taiwan denounced it as heterodox "White Lotus" and called for its suppression, and succeeded in opposing the government when there was a proposal for lifting the ban in 1981. The effort to legalize Yiguandao came from Chou Lien-hua and Chu Hai-yuan of the Institute of Ethnology at Academia Sinica, who lobbied on its behalf.

In the period of rapid economic growth of Taiwan, starting in the 1960s and proceeding through the 1980s and 1990s, Yiguandao spread its influence by entering business and industrial development. Many members became important businessmen, for instance Chang Yung-fa, the founder of the Evergreen Marine Corporation, was the chief initiator of a Yiguandao subdivision and in the 1990s almost all the managers of his corporation were Yiguandao members. The same strategy of "combining missionary work and business" facilitates the development of Yiguandao in mainland China, where Yiguandao businessmen began reestablishing the religion since the 1980s by means of investment. Another mean by which Yiguandao expanded in Taiwan was that of charity.

Through the years of the ban Yiguandao persisted as an underground phenomenon. In 1963 it was reported that the religion had about fifty thousand members, and grew rapidly through the 1970s and the 1980s, counting more than 324,000 members in 1984. Five years later in 1989 Yiguandao had 443,000 members or 2.2% of Taiwan's population. Recognizing the social power of the religion, the Kuomintang officially gave Yiguandao legal status on 13 January 1987. As of 2005 Yiguandao has 810,000 members in Taiwan (3.5% of the population) and tens of thousands of worship halls. Its members operate many of Taiwan's vegetarian restaurants.

Korea
Yiguandao was transmitted in the Korean peninsula (Hanja: 일관도 Ilgwando) in the 1940s through the pioneering work of Dukbuk Lee, Sujeun Jang, Buckdang Kim and Eunsun Kim. Korean Ilgwando is incorporated as the International Moral Association which was founded in the 1960s by Buckdang Kim (1914-1991), and as of 2015 it has 1.3 million members in South Korea (2.5% of the population).

Japan
In the 1950s Yiguandao spread to Japan (where its name is Ikkandō), during the persecutions in mainland China, and there it has attracted about fifty thousand members from both Chinese minorities and Japanese ethnic groups. It is articulated into two main branches: ① Kōmōseidōin (孔孟聖道院 Kǒng Mèng Shèngdào Yuàn, "School of the Holy Way of Confucius and Mencius") and Sentendaidōnihonsoōtendan (先天大道日本総天壇 Xiāntiāndàdào Rìběn Zǒng Tiāntán, "Japan Headquarters of the Great Way of Former Heaven") with 8000 members each; and ② Tendō (天道 Tiāndào, "Heavenly Way") and Tendo Sotendan (天道総天壇 Tiāndào Zǒng Tiāntán, "Headquarters of the Heavenly Way") respectively with 300 and 30,000 members.

Southeast Asia
Since the 1970s Yiguandao spread to Southeast Asia. In Thailand (where it is named อนุตตรธรรม Anuttharatham) it has grown so strong in recent decades to come into conflict with Buddhism; as of 2009 there were over 7000 worship halls, and it is reported that 200.000 Thais each year convert into the religion. In Singapore the Yiguandao has three great public halls (white multiple-storied buildings with traditional Chinese architectural features) and more than 2000 house churches.

Mainland China
The relationship between the government of mainland China and Yiguandao began to change by the mid-1980s. In those years, Yiguandao was spreading secretly back to mainland China from Taiwan; entrepreneurs belonging to Yiguandao were building temples, networks and factories. According to scholar Philip Clart, missionaries from Taiwan have been particularly active in proselytization in Fujian, where there is strong presence of Taiwanese-owned companies and joint ventures. According to a 1996 report the movement can be found in every province of China, and in 1978 there was one of the biggest cases of government suppression against the "Fraternal Army of the Soldiers of Heaven" (天兵弟子軍 Tiānbīng Dìzǐjūn) formed by thousands of Yiguandao members. As of 1999 the Japanese publication Tokyo Sentaku reported that there were 2 million Tiandao members in Sichuan, equal to 2.4% of the province's population.

In the 1990s backroom meetings between Chinese government officials and representatives of Yiguandao were held; by the mid-2000s these meetings had become public. Between 2000 and 2005 Yiguandao was removed from the Chinese government's official list of "evil cults", and branches of the organization were tacitly allowed to return to China. Yiguandao also cooperates with academic and non-governmental organizations in mainland China. In an attitude of growing interest for the movement on the mainland, by the 2010s a Yiguandao text was published in the People's Republic.

Structure and schisms
Yiguandao is a collection of at least nineteen divisions (subsects). Generally all of them share the rule to not proselytize among members of other branches of the "golden line" of Yiguandao. Since the 1980s some denominations of Yiguandao have established a professionalized clergy.

The primary organization unit of Yiguandao are local worship halls (佛堂 fótáng, literally "halls of awakening"). Although some of them may develop into elaborate complexes of public buildings, they are in most cases private house churches (the gatherings are held in private homes of Yiguandao members), a type of organism which provides Yiguandao the ability to blossom in the private sphere circumventing states' definitions and management of "religion".

There are a number of divisions which are no longer considered to be part of Yiguandao; some of them are: the Miledadao founded by Wang Hao-te in 1982, the Haizidao founded by Lin Jixiong in 1984, the Holy Church of China (Zhonghua Shengjiao) founded by Ma Yongchang in 1980, the Guanyindao founded by Chen Huoguo in 1984, the Yuande Shentan founded by Wu Ruiyuan, and the Jiulian Shengdao founded by Lin Zhenhe in 1992.

See also 
 Maitreya teachings 
 Ama-gi
 Caodaism

Footnotes

References

Sources
 
 
 
 
 
 
 
 
 
 
 List first published in:

External links 
 World Yiguandao Headquarters
 Australia Yiguandao Headquarters
 Korea Ilgwando International Morality Association
 Taiwan Yiguandao Association

 
Religious syncretism in Asia
Religions that require vegetarianism